is a Japanese women's professional shogi player ranked 3-dan.

Promotion history
Hayamizu's promotion history  is as follows.
 2-kyū: October 1, 1996
 1-kyū: October 1, 1997
 1-dan: April 1, 2000
 2-dan: June 21, 2005
 3-dan: December 7, 2012

Note: All ranks are women's professional ranks.

References

External links
 ShogiHub: Hayamizu, Chisa

Japanese shogi players
Living people
Women's professional shogi players
1982 births
People from Meguro
Professional shogi players from Tokyo Metropolis